Ian Stanley Palmer (born 13 July 1957) is a South African professional golfer.

Palmer was born in Uitenhage. He turned professional in 1981 and has won the 1985 PAN AM Wild Coast Sun Classic and the 1991 Nissan Challenge on the Southern Africa Tour. He also played on the European Tour for several years, winning the 1992 Johnnie Walker Asian Classic and the 1993 Jersey European Airways Open. He finished a career best 45th on the European Tour Order of Merit in each of those two seasons.

Professional wins (4)

European Tour wins (2)

Sunshine Tour wins (3)
1985 PAN AM Wild Coast Sun Classic
1989 State Mines Open
1991 Nissan Challenge

Results in major championships

Note: Palmer only played in The Open Championship.

CUT = missed the half-way cut

External links

South African male golfers
Sunshine Tour golfers
European Tour golfers
European Senior Tour golfers
Sportspeople from the Eastern Cape
People from Uitenhage
1957 births
Living people